The Bird Who Ate the Rabbit's Flower is an EP by indie rock band Of Montreal.  The five tracks were later re-released on The Bird Who Continues to Eat the Rabbit's Flower.

Track listing
 You Are An Airplane
 The Inner Light
 When a Man Is In Love With A Man
 If I Faltered Slightly Twice
 Disguises

Personnel
Derek Almstead - drums, vocals
Bryan Poole - bass, vocals
Kevin Barnes - guitar, vocals

1997 EPs
Of Montreal albums
Kindercore Records EPs